1892 Singapore Amateur Football Association Challenge Cup was the inaugurate season of the Amateur Challenge Cup, the predecessor of the Singapore Cup.

The Final was played on 27 June 1892 between Singapore Engineers and Royal Artillery, the match ending with a 2–2 draw. In the replay, held on 8 July 1892, the Engineers trounced its opponent 6–2.

Round 1

Semi-final

Replay

Second Replay

Final

Replay

References

1892
1891–92 domestic association football cups
1892 in Singapore